The Architecture the Railways Built is a British factual documentary series presented by the historian Tim Dunn, first broadcast in the United Kingdom from 28 April 2020 on Yesterday. Each of its ten episodes explores railway sites across the UK and Europe, including historical, abandoned, modern and future elements. All episodes have one featured location from Continental Europe; the rest of the featured locations in each episode are from the United Kingdom.

The series is a UKTV original, commissioned for Yesterday and produced by Brown Bob Productions. Two further series of ten episodes each were commissioned by UKTV in October 2020, with the sequel premiering on 19 January 2021, and the third series premiering on 13 September 2021. A fourth series was commissioned in 2022, with the first of ten episodes broadcast on 28 February 2023.

Following its success, Secrets of the London Underground, a programme of two series presented by Dunn, was broadcast from 2021.

Episodes

References

External links
 The Architecture the Railways Built episodes - ianVisits
 

2020 British television series debuts
2021 British television series endings
2020s British documentary television series
Documentary television series about architecture
Documentary television series about railway transport
Rail transport in Europe
UKTV original programming